The 2011–12 MHL season was the third season of the Russian Junior Hockey League. The league was divided into two conferences, with two eight-team divisions in each conference.

Regular season

Western Conference

Northeast Division

Central Division

Eastern Conference

Volga Division

Ural-Sibirien Division

Playoffs

External links 
 

Junior Hockey League (Russia) seasons
3